SS Bjarne A. Lia was a Liberty ship built in the United States during World War II. She was named after Bjarne A. Lia.

Construction 
Bjarne A. Lia was laid down on 31 October 1944, under a Maritime Commission (MARCOM) contract, MC hull 2332, by J.A. Jones Construction, Panama City, Florida; sponsored by Mrs. Bjarne A. Lia, widow of the namesake, and launched on 30 November 1944.

History
She was allocated to the Moore-McCormack Lines, Inc., 14 December 1944.

She was sold into commercial service in 1949 and after a series of sales and name changes she was scrapped on 29 June 1968 in Split.

References

Bibliography 

 
 
 
 

 

Liberty ships
Ships built in Panama City, Florida
1944 ships
Hudson River Reserve Fleet